Velibor "Borko" Radović (Serbian Cyrillic: Велибор Радовић; born 16 March 1972) is a Montenegrin-Israeli professional basketball coach and former player. He is the current head coach for Bayern Munich of the Basketball Bundesliga (BBL).

Personal life
Radović acquired Israeli citizenship while playing for Maccabi Tel Aviv and Maccabi Ra'anana and during the 1990s and 2000s, and is married to an Israeli (Michal). 
His son, Theodor Radović, was born on December 26, 2008.

Career achievements
 As assistant coach
 German League champion: 2 (with Bayern Munich: 2017–18, 2018–19)
 Serbian League champion: 3  (with Crvena zvezda: 2014–15, 2015–16, 2016–17)
 Radivoj Korać Cup winner: 3  (with Crvena zvezda: 2013–14, 2014–15, 2016–17)
 Adriatic League champion: 3  (with Crvena zvezda: 2014–15, 2015–16, 2016–17)

References

External links
 Velibor Radović at fibaeurope.com
 Velibor Radović at safsal.co.il

1972 births
Living people
ABA League players
Alba Fehérvár players
Hapoel Tel Aviv B.C. players
Ironi Nahariya players
Israeli men's basketball players
Israeli Basketball Premier League players
Israeli people of Montenegrin descent
Keravnos B.C. players
KK Crvena zvezda assistant coaches
KK Crvena zvezda players
KK Split players
Maccabi Ra'anana players
Maccabi Tel Aviv B.C. players
Montenegrin expatriate basketball people in Poland
Montenegrin expatriate basketball people in Serbia
Montenegrin men's basketball players
SLUC Nancy Basket players
Small forwards
Sportspeople from Podgorica